Corinth is a city in and the county seat of Alcorn County, Mississippi, United States. The population was 14,573 at the 2010 census.  Its ZIP codes are 38834 and 38835. It lies on the state line with Tennessee.

History 

Corinth was founded in 1853 as Cross City, so-called because it served as a junction for the Mobile & Ohio and Memphis & Charleston railroads. It was the town's early newspaper editor, W. E. Gibson, who suggested its current name for the city of Corinth in Greece that also served as a crossroads.

Corinth's location at the junction of two railroads made it strategically important to the Confederacy during the American Civil War. Confederate General P. G. T. Beauregard retreated to Corinth after the Battle of Shiloh (April 1862), pursued by Union Major General Henry W. Halleck. General Beauregard abandoned the town on May 29 when General Halleck approached, letting it fall into the Union's hands. Since Halleck had approached so cautiously, digging entrenchments at every stop for over a month, this action has been known as the Siege of Corinth.

The Union sent Maj. Gen. William Rosecrans to Corinth as well and concentrated its forces in the city. The Second Battle of Corinth took place on October 3−4, 1862, when Confederate Maj. Gen. Earl Van Dorn attempted to retake the city.

Locales on the National Register of Historic Places

 Battery Williams (also known as Fort Williams)
 Siege and Battle of Corinth Sites
 Coliseum Theatre- built in the early 20th century in the Colonial Revival style
 Corinth National Cemetery
 Downtown Corinth Historic District
 Dr. Joseph M. Bynum House—a home in the Late Gothic Revival style built in the late 19th century
 Federal Siege Trench (also known as Harper Road Trench)
 Fort Robinette (also known as Battery Robinette)—site of the Civil War Interpretive Center
 Jacinto Courthouse (also called the Old Tishomingo County Courthouse)—built in the mid-19th century in the Federal style
 L.C. Steele House
 Midtown Corinth Historic District
 Moores Creek site—a prehistoric Native American site from 3000 to 3500 B.C.
 Old U.S. Post Office
 Rienzi Commercial Historic District
 Thomas F. Dilworth House
 Union Battery F, Battle of Corinth
 Union Earthworks
 Veranda House (also known as the Curlee House)—built in 1857, it served as headquarters for Confederate generals during the Battle of Corinth

Geography

Corinth is located in northeast Mississippi at the intersection of (north/south) U.S. Route 45 and (east/west) U.S. Route 72. U.S. 45 runs to the west of the city as a bypass, leading north  to Selmer, Tennessee, and south  to Booneville. U.S. 72 runs through the southern part of the city, leading southeast  to Burnsville and west  to Walnut. It is the county seat of Alcorn County, which is the smallest county by area in the state of Mississippi.

Communities near Corinth
 Eastview, Tennessee, 
 Farmington, 
 Guys, Tennessee, 
 Kossuth, 
 Michie, Tennessee, 
 Ramer, Tennessee,

Rivers and streams
 Bridge Creek
 Elam Creek
 Phillips Creek
 Turner Creek

Climate
The climate is humid subtropical (Köppen: Cfa) like all of Mississippi but with frequent and regular gusts of snow.

Demographics

2020 census

As of the 2020 United States Census, there were 14,622 people, 6,087 households, and 3,555 families residing in the city.

2000 census
As of the census of 2000, there were 14,054 people, 6,220 households, and 3,800 families residing in the city. The racial makeup of the city was 76.28% White, 21.60% African American, 0.09% Native American, 0.36% Asian, 0.12% Pacific Islander, 0.84% from other races, and 0.73% from two or more races. Hispanic or Latino of any race were 1.73% of the population.

There were 6,220 households, out of which 26.0% had children under the age of 18 living with them, 42.9% were married couples living together, 14.8% had a female householder with no husband present, and 38.9% were non-families. Of all households, 35.6% were made up of individuals, and 16.0% had someone living alone who was 65 years of age or older. The average household size was 2.19 and the average family size was 2.82.

In the city, the population was spread out, with 21.8% under the age of 18, 9.3% from 18 to 24, 25.6% from 25 to 44, 23.7% from 45 to 64, and 19.6% who were 65 years of age or older. The median age was 40 years. For every 100 females, there were 85.5 males. For every 100 females age 18 and over, there were 81.0 males.

The median income for a household in the city was $23,436, and the median income for a family was $35,232. Males had a median income of $29,027 versus $21,071 for females. The per capita income for the city was $15,452. About 18.2% of families and 22.2% of the population were below the poverty line, including 26.2% of those under age 18 and 23.9% of those age 65 or over.

Education

Public schools
Corinth School District:

 Corinth High School—grades 9–12 with an enrollment of 473
 Corinth Middle School-grades 5–8 with an enrollment of 265
 Corinth Elementary School—grades K–4
 Easom High School (the only African American school in the city before desegregation; Became home of South Corinth Elementary School teaching 5th and 6th Grade until the 2009–2010 school year, when it ceased to be used until 2014 when a health clinic opened in the building)

Alcorn School District:

Alcorn Alternative School
 Alcorn Central Elementary—grades K–4, with enrollment of 520
 Alcorn Central Middle School—grades 5–8 with an enrollment of 539
 Alcorn Central High School—grades 9–12 with an enrollment of 515
 Biggersville Elementary—grades K–6 with an enrollment of 161
 Biggersville High School—grades 7–12 with an enrollment of 236
Kossuth Elementary School—grades K–4 with an enrollment of 562
 Kossuth High School—grades 9–12 with an enrollment of 438
 Kossuth Middle School—grades 5–8 with an enrollment of 499

Libraries
 Corinth Public Library—part of the Northeast Regional Library System

Museums
 Northeast Mississippi Museum
 Corinth Civil War Interpretive Center (part of the National Park Service)
 Artist Guild Museum and Shop
 Museum of Southern Culture
 Black History Museum

Health care
 Veranda Health Center
 Magnolia Regional Health Center

Transportation

Highways
 U.S. Route 45—runs north–south from Lake Superior to the Gulf of Mexico
 U.S. Route 72—runs east–west from Chattanooga, Tennessee to Memphis
 Mississippi Highway 2—runs southwest from the Tennessee state line to Hickory Flat
 Mississippi Highway 145

Air travel
Roscoe Turner Airport is a general aviation airport just outside Corinth.

Media

Newspapers
 Daily Corinthian

FM and AM radio stations
 WKCU 1350, Country music
 WXRZ 94.3, News and Talk / Supertalk Mississippi (Mississippi political and local)
 WADI 95.3, 95.5 The Bee (Country)
 Radio Mexico 107.9 (Spanish)

Notable people
 Neal Brooks Biggers, Jr., federal judge
 Don Blasingame, baseball player
 Ezekiel S. Candler, Jr., U.S. congressman
 Bert Cumby, Army intelligence officer
 Larry Dorsey, football coach
 Steve Gaines, pastor
 Frances Gaither, novelist
 Philip Henson, scout and spy
 Russell Keaton, aviation cartoonist, first illustrator for the Sunday edition of the Buck Rogers cartoon and first cartoonist to feature women in leading roles in an aviation cartoon. See Flyin' Jenny.
 Etheridge Knight, poet
 Peggy Smith Martin, Illinois state representative
 Jimbo Mathus, musician
 Thomas K. McCraw, educator
 Maty Noyes, singer
 John F. Osborne, editor and journalist
 Rubel Phillips, politician
 Thomas Hal Phillips, author
 J.E. Pitts, poet and songwriter
 Saving Abel, rock band
 Everett Sharp, football player
 Jackie Simpson, professional football player.
 Orma Rinehart Smith, federal judge
 John Benjamin Splann, Mississippi state senator
 Roscoe Turner, aviator
 Jack Yarber, musician
 Bobby Emmons, American keyboard player and songwriter, keyboardist of The Memphis Boys keyboards on tracks by Elvis Presley, Willie Nelson
 Weyman "Big Daddy" Hilliard Cox, W.W.II U.S.Navy SEEBEE's, University of Mississippi Football / Quarterback - 1925.

See also

Corinth Depot
Johnny Vomit & The Dry Heaves - a garage band from Corinth
Slugburger

Notes

References
 Brieger, James. Hometown, Mississippi. (1997).

External links

City of Corinth official website

 

 
Cities in Mississippi
County seats in Mississippi
Micropolitan areas of Mississippi
Populated places established in 1853
Cities in Alcorn County, Mississippi
1853 establishments in Mississippi